Heidi Stroh (born 1941) is a German stage, film and television actress.

Selected filmography
 Das Dorf ohne Moral (1960)
 Blood and Black Lace (1964)
 Cadavere a spasso (1965)
 Lust for Love (1967)
 The Cat Has Nine Lives (1968)
 Helgalein (1969)
 The Stuff That Dreams Are Made Of (1972)
 MitGift (1976)
 Beautiful and Wild on Ibiza (1980)

References

Bibliography 
 Peter Cowie & Derek Elley. World Filmography: 1967. Fairleigh Dickinson University Press, 1977.

External links 
 

1941 births
Living people
German television actresses
German stage actresses
German film actresses
Actors from Jena